Ishqaa (ਇਸ਼ਕਾ) is an Indian romantic thriller Punjabi film directed by Nav Bajwa and starring Nav Bajwa, Aman Singh Deep, Payal Rajput and Karamjit Anmol as the main protagonists of the film. This is the first production and direction of Nav Bajwa Films.

Cast
Nav Bajwa
Aman Singh Deep
Payal Rajput
Karamjit Anmol
Shivinder Mahal
Satwant Kaur
Dr. Ranjit
Gurpreet Chadda

Soundtrack

The soundtrack of the film by Money Aujla and score by Gurcharan Singh, lyrics are by Sidhu Moosewala and Maninder Kailey. The songs are sung by Hardy Sandhu, Akhil, Dilpreet Dhillon, Harshdeep, Kamal Khaan, Naman Hanjra, Masha Ali and Sufi Sparrow.

References 

Punjabi-language Indian films
2010s Punjabi-language films
2019 films